Megachile palaonica is a species of bee in the family Megachilidae. It was described by Theodore Dru Alison Cockerell in 1939.

References

Palaonica
Insects described in 1939